Baljit Singh may refer to:  

Sant Baljit Singh, spiritual leader (guru) in the Sant Mat tradition
Dr Zeus (Baljit Singh Padam), Bhangra musician from the UK
Baljit Singh Chadha, businessman from Canada
Baljit Singh (cricketer, born 1977), Danish cricketer
Baljit Singh (cricketer, born 1981)
Baljit Singh (Italian cricketer), Italian cricketer
Baljit Singh Dhillon, field hockey midfielder from India
Baljit Singh (field hockey, born 1986), field hockey defender from Malaysia
Baljit Singh (field hockey, born 1987), field hockey defender from Malaysia
Baljit Singh Saini, field hockey defender and midfielder from India